Bolaji Yusuf Ayinla (popularly known as B.Y.A) is a Nigerian Politician and Member of the House of Representative of Nigeria representing Mushin II Federal Constituency after he emerged winner at the  2015 Nigerian General Election under the platform of the All Progressive Congress (APC).

Early life and education 
Bolaji Ayinla was born on 10 October,1959 in Lagos, Nigeria. He attended Muslim High School, Sagamu, Ogun State where he obtained his West African Senior School Certificate. 

Bolaji expressed interest in pursuing a career in the military, specifically as a soldier or pilot. However, due to his poor eyesight at the time, he was unable to meet the necessary requirements and was consequently not accepted into either field. He proceeded to Centre for Marketing and Management studies to obtain his diploma certificate.

Political career 
Bolaji Ayinla began his political career in 2003 after being elected to represent his constituency at the Lagos State House of Assembly from 2003 to 2015 under the platform of the Action Congress of Nigeria (ACN). He was Chairman, Lagos State House of Assembly Committee on Public Accounts. Having spent three terms in the State House of Assembly, he contested for the Federal House of representatives under the Platform of the All Progressive Congress (APC) and won to represent Mushin II Federal Constituency at the 2015 Nigerian General Election. In 2018, Bolaji Ayinla moved  a motion for the gradual and consistent repair and maintenance of roads throughout Nigeria.

References 

Yoruba politicians
Living people
1960 births
Nigerian Muslims